Line 4 is one of the sixteen lines of the Paris Métro rapid transit system. Situated mostly within the boundaries of the City of Paris, it connects Porte de Clignancourt in the north and Bagneux-Lucie Aubrac in the south, travelling across the heart of the city. Until it southern terminus was changed from Porte d'Orléans to Mairie de Montrouge in 2013, the line was sometimes referred to as the Clignancourt – Orléans Line. At  in length, it connects with all Paris Métro lines apart from the very short 3bis and 7bis branch lines, as well as with all 5 RER express lines. It also serves three of the Paris Railway stations, Gare du Nord, Gare de l'Est, and Gare Montparnasse. It is the second-busiest Métro line after Line 1, carrying over 154 million passengers in 2004.

Line 4 was the first line to connect to the south side of the River Seine, through an underwater tunnel built between 1905 and 1907. Line 4 long ran the oldest cars in service on the system, the MP 59. They used rheostats to dissipate the braking power through resistance and made it the hottest line in the system. Those trains were withdrawn from service during the course of 2011 and 2012 after 45 years (with some being in service for 50 years). They were replaced by the MP 89 CC stock transferred from Line 1, once new driverless trains made those redundant on that line. (From :fr:Ligne 4 du métro de Paris).

In 2013, Line 4 was extended for the first time since its initial construction, into the southern suburbs of Montrouge. The line was further extended to Bagneux–Lucie Aubrac in 2022, connecting to the future Grand Paris Express. The line has been retrofitted for full automation, with the first automated trains commencing service on 12 September 2022.

History

Chronology
 21 April 1908: A first section of the line was inaugurated to the north of the Seine between Porte de Clignancourt and Châtelet.
 30 October 1909: A second section of the line was inaugurated south of the Seine between Porte d'Orléans and Raspail.
 9 January 1910: Both sections were linked by a new tunnel between Châtelet and Raspail.  Line 4 was the first line crossing the Seine river underground.
 1967: The rails were converted in order to cater for rubber-tired trains. The MP 59 rolling stock replaced the steel-wheeled Sprague-Thomson stock.
 3 October 1977: The station Les Halles was rebuilt to interchange with the new RER network.
 23 May 2011: Cascading of MP 59 to MP 89CC rolling stock began.
 21 December 2012: The last MP 59 (#6021) was withdrawn after 45 years of service on Line 4.
 23 March 2013: Extension south to Mairie de Montrouge officially opened to passengers, marking the first extension of Line 4 since its inception.
 2016: Automation work begins.
 13 January 2022: Extension south to Bagneux-Lucie Aubrac officially opened to passengers.
 12 September 2022: First automatic trains (MP89, MP05 and MP14) enter service

Origins

Line 4, opened in 1908, was the last line of the original concession of the Compagnie du chemin de fer métropolitain de Paris and the first to cross the Seine underground (Line 5—now Line 6 at this point—crossed the river on the Passy bridge, later renamed the Pont de Bir-Hakeim in 1906). The route was the subject of lengthy discussions that delayed the start of construction of the tunnel. It was originally planned as a straight line under the Rue du Louvre, under the Seine in line with the street, under the Institut de France, along the Rue de Rennes and then the Boulevard Raspail to the Porte d'Orleans.

But as a result of the delay in beginning the extension of the Rue de Rennes as part of Haussmann's plan to the Seine—which was never carried out—and the outcry from the academics who refused categorically to agree to the line passing under the Institut de France, the route was eventually changed to cross further east through the Place du Châtelet and the Île de la Cité. The new route also has more coherence as a north–south route following the main traffic flows. A second modification of the route was also made: it was decided to make a temporary deviation via the major station of Gare Montparnasse to avoid a further delay in opening the line, which was eagerly awaited. This was made necessary by the delay in building the new Boulevard Raspail between Rue de Rennes and Boulevard du Montparnasse. Once the Boulevard Raspail was completed, it was planned to take the shorter route and bypass the Gare Montparnasse. To the south of the Vavin station the tunnel provides for the final route along the Boulevard Raspail. But the value in serving three major mainline stations by the line later led to the abandonment of this proposal.

A spectacular construction site
In 1905 construction was started by the company of Léon Chagnaud—a former mason from Creuse (a department with a tradition of supplying building workers in France)—and line 4 became the first to cross the Seine underground. The method used for crossing under the river is that of metal caissons, twenty to forty meters in length mounted on the banks and sunken vertically in the river bed. The ends of the caissons were blocked and they were towed to their location before being ballasted with water and sunk in the riverbed. A chamber filled with pressurised air was built at the lower level of these caissons so that workers could excavate under the caissons. Each caisson gradually sank to its final position as the ground below it was removed. The northern stream of the Seine required three caissons, the southern stream two caissons.

The crossing of the Seine also involved the freezing of saturated ground between the station of Saint-Michel and the Seine, under the line of the Chemin de Fer de Paris à Orléans (now RER line C) in 1908 and 1909. The installation of two refrigeration plants allowed the movement of brine cooled to −25 °C in dozens of tubes to stabilize the ground.

The northern section was the first completed: it was opened on 21 April 1908 from Porte de Clignancourt to Châtelet. The southern section was opened 30 in October 1909 from Porte d'Orleans to Raspail. The two sections were connected on 9 January 1910. However, the line was closed to traffic a few days later in January 1910, when the level of the Seine broke its banks during the worst flood of the century. On the morning of 24 January 1910, a significant inflow of water at the Seine crossing interrupted services between Châtelet and Vavin, although services were restored later in the day. But the inflow increased and services were again halted in the afternoon. On 26 January Châtelet station and the crossing under the river was completely flooded and slowly rose in the tunnel. On the night of 27 and 28 January, flooding reached Réaumur – Sébastopol and eventually Gare de l'Est: The line at its minimum was reduced to operating between Clignancourt and Gare du Nord and between Vavin and Porte d'Orleans. The fall in the level of flooding during February allowed a gradual resumption of operations, but full service was not restored to 6 April after repair of extensive damage caused to the infrastructure.

During the politically turbulent 1930s, Line 4 had its own drama: on 27 July 1934, a package left in a carriage was carried into the office of its chief supervisor, located on the platform of Montparnasse. The package exploded, killing the chief supervisor and another officer and wounding four passengers. The assassins were never found.

During World War II the most violent bombing Paris suffered was on the night of 20 and 21 April 1944 when the rail freight yard of la Chapelle and the main truck workshop at Rue Championnet were hit. The roof of the Simplon station was hit by a bomb and it collapsed on the tracks and platforms. After repairs the line was brought back into service a few days later.

The rubber tyre metro and the deviation of the line

The RATP was satisfied by experimentation with rubber tyres on Line 11 beginning in 1956. It therefore decided to equip lines 1 and 4 for rubber-tyre operations, which can increase line capacity by providing better acceleration and decelerations as a result of a much superior grip.

In the early 1960s these two lines were the two busiest on the network, with loads of 140% of capacity during the evening peak. However, as this change alone was insufficient to overcome this saturation, the length of stations was lengthened from 75 to 90 metres, allowing the lengthening of train from five to six carriages. This work was carried out very quickly and, as early as October 1965, trains of six carriages traversed the line. On 3 October 1966, the first train composed of MP 59 electric multiple units operated on the line. The Line 4 trains were identical to those on Line 1, being composed of four motors and two trailers per train. The line's MP 59 fleet included 556 carriages: 376 powered carriages and 180 trailers. On 17 July 1967, the last steel-wheeled train left the line to strengthen the service of others with a hundred cars built before 1914 scrapped. In February 1971, line 4 was the second network after line 11 to be equipped with semi-automatic operation, with a system known as Grecque ("Greek"). This allowed trains once started by the driver to run automatically and stop at the next station.

Since its opening the only change of the route of the line took place in early October 1977 with the deviation of the line with the relocation of the station at Les Halles. During the excavation of the enormous Les Halles complex the station of Les Halles was relocated about ten metres further east to allow a shorter connection to Châtelet – Les Halles RER station. For this, three hundred and thirty meters of tunnel were built to join the old route. The changeover took place on three consecutive nights from 10 pm on Friday, 30 September 1977 to the beginning of services on Monday, 3 October. On the first night, the new track 2 was connected, on the second night, the new track 1 was built and on the last night it was connected.

On 6 August 2005 at 4:42 pm, a fire on a train at Simplon due to the malfunction of a circuit breaker caused the evacuation of two MP 59 trains with 19 people mildly affected. The fire was extinguished by fire fighters at around 6:00 pm.

Extension to Montrouge and the MP 89

Until 2013, Line 4 was one of a few lines (the others being semicircular lines 2 and 6, as well as Line 14) that had never been extended beyond the "gates" of Paris. During the 1920s, a preliminary extension towards la Vache-Noire was planned but never carried out. Since that time, no other extension plan was brought up. In 2008, nearly a century after its opening, construction of a one-station extension towards Mairie de Montrouge began. The new station officially opened to passengers on 23 March 2013, allowing one to travel from Montrouge to Clignancourt in 30 minutes. Mairie de Montrouge is a traditional two-tracked station.

In addition to the Montrouge extension, there has recently been a much needed refreshing in rolling stock for Line 4, as the MP 59 trainsets were reaching the end of their useful lives. The automation of Line 1 and purchasing of new automated rolling stock (the MP 05) allowed the RATP to replace the MP 59 with the MP 89CC rolling stock from Line 1. Testing of the MP 89 during overnight hours took place in 2010, with the first train (#01) to be transferred to Line 4 in April, 2011 and enter service on 23 May 2011. A second train (#44) entered service on 10 September 2011. The first MP 59 train that was retired was #6049, which was pulled from service in April, 2011.

As the MP 05 rolling stock began to debut on Line 1, the pace of transferring the MP 89CC stock from Line 1 to Line 4 increased to roughly 3 trains per month. Since January 2012, the RATP kept this rate of transfer (increasing the rate to 4 trains during November and December) despite only being able to remove 2 MP 59 trainsets from service each month. During the course of 2011, the following trains were transferred from Line 1 to Line 4: #s 14, 20, 29, 30, 31, 34, 38, and 40. Train #s 03 through 25, 27 through 42, 43, 44, 48, 49, 51, and 52 were transferred during the course of 2012. #45 was transferred on 3 January 2013, marking the 47th train to be moved to Line 4. Between February and March 2013, #s 02, 46, 47, and 50 were transferred. The final MP 89CC train was be #26. The last MP 59 train to be pulled from service was #6021, which was withdrawn on 21 December 2012. Though many MP 59 trains operated on Line 4 for roughly 45 years, those trains that were brought over from Line 1 during the late 1990s have circulated throughout the Metro for about 50 years.

Extension to Bagneux

Following the opening of Mairie de Montrouge, plans were already in the works to further extend Line 4 another 1.8km southward. This extension consists of two stations: Barbara at the border between Montrouge and Bagneux (in Montrouge) and Bagneux-Lucie Aubrac. In October 2011, the STIF announced that construction of the Bagneux extension began in 2014. The extension opened on 13 January 2022. In 2025, Bagneux-Lucie Aubrac will provide a connection to Paris Métro Line 15 of Grand Paris Express.

Automation of the line 
The line is being converted to an automated system (like Line 1), with completion originally expected by 2019. Initial plans to begin conversion shortly after the completion of the Line 1 conversion were put on hold for a time due to high costs (From :fr:Ligne 4 du métro de Paris). The RATP confirmed on 2 April 2013 that Line 4 would be fully automated, but still stopped short of giving a timeline of the conversion. In January 2016, Siemens was awarded a €70 million contract to fully automate Line 4. The plan at that time was that a mix of crewed and driverless trains would start running in 2020 and that the line would be fully driverless by 2022.

Delays partly brought upon by the COVID-19 pandemic however pushed the introduction of mixed rolling stock back to summer 2022. This involves transferring MP 89CA and MP05 railcars from Line 14, which are in-turn replaced there by the first batch of MP 14CA sets. The MP 89CC trains removed from line 4 are themselves refurbished, shortened to 5 cars, and transferred to Line 6. The first MP 89CA and MP 05 railcars entered Line 4 revenue service on September 12, 2022, and were followed by the first MP 14CA trainset on September 15.

Future

Northern Extension towards Saint-Ouen
Phase 1 (2007–2013) of the Schéma directeur de la région Île-de-France ("Master Plan for the Île-de-France region", SDRIF), adopted by resolution of the Regional Council of Ile-de-France on 25 September 2008A, included a Northward extension to the "docks" of Saint-Ouen (an urban redevelopment project next to the Seine) via Mairie de Saint-Ouen (where Line 4 would connect to Line 13's St. Denis branch and to Line 14). However no detailed studies have yet been carried out, nor any funding set aside.

Rolling Stock
Over the years, Line 4 has seen the following rolling stock.
 M1: 1908-1930
 Sprague-Thomson: 1930 - 1967
 MP 59: 1967 - December, 2012
 MP 89CC: May, 2011 – Present
 MP 89CA: September, 2022 - Present
 MP 05: September, 2022 - Present
 MP 14CA: September, 2022 - Present

(From :fr:Ligne 4 du métro de Paris)

Workshops
Until March 2013; light maintenance of the MP 89CC rolling stock of Line 4 was handled within the station of Porte d'Orléans (CDT). Platform 2 of the station (in the direction of Porte de Clignancourt contains inspection pits, which allow routine light maintenance work and troubleshooting of the first level. Both Porte d'Orléans and Porte de Clignancourt also contain loop tracks where trains can be stored overnight (although many trains are stored within the main tunnels due to a lack of a sufficient garage). This protocol changed when a new garage located south of the new station Mairie de Montrouge opened. Track 3 of station Porte d'Orléans will eventually be dismantled and covered over to make way for a new access point into the station.

Second level maintenance is handled at the Saint-Ouen shops, located just to the north of the Porte de Clignancourt terminus (and its northern loops). The facility extends over an area of 34,000 sq meters and opened in 1908. The shops have been renovated and expanded over the years, including a recent extension to house MP 89CC trainsets that are undergoing routine maintenance (AMT).

In addition to maintaining the MP 89CC trainsets, the Saint-Quen shops also handle heavy maintenance and overhaul of the MF 77 steel-wheel stock trains for lines 7, 8 and 13, as well as numerous auxiliary/service trains. The shop is also specialized in the review of electronic equipment of all network hardware. As of 2007, 60 officers are assigned to train maintenance and 220 to the maintenance of equipment.

All heavy maintenance work for the MP 89CC trainsets are handled in the workshops of Fontenay, located just east of the Chateau de Vincennes terminus of Line 1.

(From :fr:Ligne 4 du métro de Paris)

Map and stations

Stations renamed
 15 November 1913: Vaugirard station was renamed Saint-Placide.
 5 May 1931: Boulevard Saint-Denis was renamed Strasbourg – Saint-Denis.
 25 August 1931: Marcadet (on line 4) and Poissonniers (on line 12) were combined and the resulting station was renamed Marcadet – Poissonniers.
 6 October 1942: Montparnasse (on lines 4 and 12) and Bienvenüe (on lines 6 and the current 13) were combined and the resulting station was renamed Montparnasse – Bienvenüe.

Themed Stations
 Réaumur – Sébastopol has an interactive exhibition devoted to the Conservatoire National des Arts et Metiers (CNAM), located nearby. There are also LCD screens that include interviews and short films on the teaching of the conservatory.
 Barbès – Rochechouart has an exhibit on the occupation of Paris during World War II, including newspaper clippings, photos, and a map showing the insurrection of Paris in August 1944
 Odéon has a small exhibit on the northbound platform that is dedicated to Georges Jacques Danton; it includes a bust of the French revolutionary, and a copy of the decree proclaiming the First Republic in 1792 .
 Saint-Germain-des-Prés is lined with decor evoking the history of literary creation in the district. Extracts of literary works are projected onto the roof, the station being devoid of the usual billboards. This exhibit showcases the stories of young talent in literature.
 Montparnasse – Bienvenüe contains an exhibit honoring principal engineer of the Paris Métro, Fulgence Bienvenüe. It has been naturally selected as an exhibition space on the network technology and literary history of the subway in 2000 during its centennial. Many books citing excerpts from the subway especially adorn the grand hall that connects each of the four metro lines in the station (4, 6, 12, and 13).
 Mouton-Duvernet was once adorned with orange wall tiles when it was renovated in 1970. The orange styling quickly became known as the "Mouton style". However, the station was renovated again during the 2000s, reverting its theme back to the classic white tile.
 Both Saint-Michel and Cité contain dark-colored metal structures that serve as interconnecting levels between the platform level and the entry/ticketing level.
(From :fr:Ligne 4 du métro de Paris)

Tourism
Metro line 4 passes near several places of interest and therefore often crowded :
 Barbès and the Goutte d'Or and their African and Asian influences.
 Gare du Nord and Gare de l'Est 19th century train stations.
 L'Île de la Cité with the Notre Dame Cathedral.
 Saint-Michel and the Latin Quarter.
 Saint-Germain des Prés quarter with its church and famous cafés.
 Rue de Rennes shopping street.
 Luxembourg Garden.
 Montparnasse, its famous cafés, the Gare Montparnasse and the Montparnasse Tower.

Reception 
According to Facebook group New Urbanist Memes for Transit-Oriented Teens, M4 is considered "chaotic good" on the Dungeons & Dragons (D&D) alignment system.

Gallery

Notes

See also

References

External links

  RATP official website
  RATP english speaking website
  Interactive Map of the RER (from RATP's website)
  Interactive Map of the Paris métro (from RATP's website)
  Mobidf website, dedicated to the RER (unofficial)
  Metro-Pole website, dedicated to Paris public transports (unofficial)
 TRUCK (bogie)

 
Articles containing video clips
Railway lines opened in 1908
1908 establishments in France